Rounders is a 1998 American drama film about the underground world of high-stakes poker, directed by John Dahl and starring Matt Damon and Edward Norton. The story follows two friends who need to win at high-stakes poker to quickly pay off a large debt. The term rounder refers to a person traveling around from city to city seeking high-stakes card games.

Rounders opened to mixed reviews and was moderately successful at the box office. Following the poker boom in the early 2000s, the film became a cult hit.

Plot 
New York City law student and gifted poker player Mike McDermott (Matt Damon) dreams of winning the World Series of Poker. At an underground Texas hold 'em game run by Russian mobster Teddy "KGB" (John Malkovich), an overconfident Mike loses his entire $30,000 bankroll in a single hand. Shaken, he promises his girlfriend and fellow student Jo (Gretchen Mol) he has quit poker, and concentrates on law school. His mentor Joey Knish (John Turturro) offers to stake him to rebuild his bankroll but Mike declines, and instead accepts a part-time job to make ends meet.

Several months pass and Mike stays true to his promise until his childhood friend Lester "Worm" Murphy (Edward Norton) is released from prison. While Mike is an honest player, Worm is a hustler and unapologetic cheat. To help Worm pay off a debt, Mike sets him up with games across town and reluctantly sits in on a game, interfering with his studies and his relationship with Jo. Mike allows Worm to play on his credit at the Chesterfield Club. After being loaned $2,000, Worm gets up to $10,000 and cashes out for the full amount which starts a tab in Mike's name. Worm runs into Grama (Michael Rispoli), a dangerous pimp, who reveals that he has bought Worm’s debt – Worm now owes $25,000 directly to Grama, who is working for KGB. Grama takes Worm’s $10,000 he left the Chesterfield with, threatening him to pay the rest. As Mike returns to his poker lifestyle and friends, Jo ends their relationship.

Mike learns from Petra (Famke Janssen) at the Chesterfield that Worm has now racked up a $7,000 debt in Mike’s name. In Atlantic City, Worm tells Mike about his debt to Grama but withholds that he is working for KGB. Mike proposes to Grama that Worm pay weekly installments; Grama considers the offer but also mocks Worm for his inability to pay him. Worm responds by insulting Grama and as the two nearly come to blows, Mike defuses the situation by agreeing to vouch for Worm and an angry Grama gives them five days to pay the remaining $15,000. Mike decides to help Worm win the money by playing in several games in and around the city.

On a winning streak, Mike earns $7,200 in three days, but still needs to double it in forty-eight hours. Worm directs Mike to Binghamton for a game hosted by New York state troopers, where he comes close to winning the $7,800 needed before Worm unexpectedly joins the game. Soon after, a trooper catches Worm base-dealing to help Mike; they are beaten up and relieved of their entire bankroll. Worm finally confesses that Grama is working for KGB. With their lives in danger Worm decides to flee, but Mike returns to the city, cutting ties with Worm.

Mike asks Grama for more time, to no avail. He asks Knish for the money but is refused out of principle. During the conversation with Knish, Mike reveals his motivation for taking the ill-fated risk at KGB's club (citing beating poker legend Johnny Chan at a single hand in Atlantic City), and why he thinks he can compete and possibly win the World Series of Poker. Knish stays firm. Desperate, Mike asks his law school professor Petrovsky (Martin Landau), who loans him $10,000. Mike challenges KGB to a second heads-up no-limit Texas hold'em game for the remaining debt, with winner-take-all stakes, which KGB accepts. Mike beats KGB in the first session, winning $20,000. KGB offers to let Mike’s winnings "ride" and continue the game, but Mike – with enough to pay off most of his debts – declines. As he is about to leave, KGB taunts Mike that he is paying him with the money that he lost to KGB from their previous game. Mike changes his mind and decides to continue playing.

Mike doubles the blinds at the risk of losing everything to KGB again, and possibly his life. As the night wears on, he spots KGB's tell and folds, deducing that KGB has a better hand. Irate at the missed chance to bust Mike, KGB begins to play on "tilt". In the final hand, Mike baits a boastful KGB into going all-in and defeats him with a nut straight. KGB throws a tantrum at having been lured into a mistake. Despite Grama’s urging, KGB, rattled, calls off his goons and admits that Mike won fairly, allowing him to leave with his winnings.

With over $60,000, Mike settles Worm’s $15,000 debt to Grama, the Chesterfield’s $6,000 credit, Petrovsky’s $10,000 loan, and restores his original bankroll of "three stacks of high society." He drops out of law school, says goodbye to Jo, and leaves New York for Las Vegas to play in the World Series of Poker.

Cast

 Matt Damon as Mike McDermott
 Edward Norton as Lester "Worm" Murphy
 John Malkovich as Teddy "KGB"
 John Turturro as Joey Knish†
 Famke Janssen as Petra
 Murphy Guyer as Sergeant Detweiler
 Michael Rispoli as Grama
 Martin Landau as Judge Abe Petrovsky
 Gretchen Mol as Jo
 Bill Yeagle as Russian Thug
 Melina Kanakaredes as Barbara
 Josh Mostel as Zagosh
 Tom Aldredge as Judge Marinacci
 Michael Lombard as District Attorney Shields
 Lenny Clarke as Savino 
 Chris Messina as Higgins
 Goran Višnjić as Maurice 
 David Zayas as Trooper Osborne
 Johnny Chan as himself
 Bill Camp as Eisenberg
 Josh Pais as Weitz
 Adam LeFevre as Sean Frye

† Turturro's character was based on underground poker player Joel "Bagels" Rosenberg

Production 
Principal photography for Rounders began in December 1997; it took place mostly in New York City. Exceptions include the law school scenes (filmed at Rutgers School of Law-Newark) and the State Trooper poker game and parking lot scenes (filmed at the B.P.O Elks Lodge in Ridgefield Park, New Jersey).

Reception

Box office 
Rounders was released on September 11, 1998, in 2,176 theaters and grossed $8.5 million during its opening weekend. It went on to make $22.9 million domestically.

Critical response 
On Rotten Tomatoes, the film has an approval rating of 65% based on 81 reviews, with an average score of 6.20/10. The site's critical consensus reads: "Richly atmospheric and colorful performances contributed to the movie's entertainment value." Metacritic gives the film a weighted average score of 54 out of 100 based on 32 reviews, indicating "mixed or average reviews". Audiences polled by CinemaScore gave the film an average grade of "B-" on an A+ to F scale.

Roger Ebert of the Chicago Sun-Times gave the film three stars out of four and wrote: "Rounders sometimes has a noir look but it never has a noir feel, because it's not about losers (or at least it doesn't admit it is). It's essentially a sports picture, in which the talented hero wins, loses, faces disaster, and then is paired off one last time against the champ." In her review for The New York Times, Janet Maslin wrote: "Though John Dahl's Rounders finally adds up to less than meets the eye, what does meet the eye (and ear) is mischievously entertaining." USA Today gave the film three out of four stars and wrote: "The card playing is well-staged, and even those who don't know a Texas hold-'em ('the Cadillac of poker') from a Texas hoedown will get a vicarious charge out of the action." Entertainment Weekly gave the film a "B" rating and Owen Gleiberman wrote, "Norton, cast in what might have once been the Sean Penn role (hideous shirts, screw-you attitude), gives Worm a shifty, amphetamine soul and a pleasing alacrity ... Norton's performance never really goes anywhere, but that's okay, since the story is just an excuse to lead the characters from one poker table to the next."

Peter Travers, in his review for Rolling Stone said of John Malkovich's performance: "Of course, no one could guess the extent to which Malkovich is now capable of chewing scenery. He surpasses even his eyeballrolling as Cyrus the Virus in Con Air. Munching Oreo cookies, splashing the pot with chips (a poker no-no) and speaking with a Russian accent that defies deciphering ("Ho-kay, Meester sum of a beech"), Malkovich soars so far over the top, he's passing Pluto." In his review for the San Francisco Chronicle, Mick LaSalle said of Damon's performance: "Mike should supply the drive the film otherwise lacks, and Damon doesn't. We might believe he can play cards, but we don't believe he needs to do it, in the way, say, that the 12-year-old Mozart needed to write symphonies. He's not consumed with genius. He's a nice guy with a skill." In his review for The Globe and Mail, Liam Lacey wrote: "The main problem with Rounders is that the movie never quite knows what it is about: What is the moral ante?"

Despite an unremarkable theatrical release, Rounders has a following, particularly among poker enthusiasts.

There are pro poker players who credit the film for getting them into the game. The film drew in successful players such as Brian Rast, Hevad Khan, Gavin Griffin, and Dutch Boyd. Vanessa Rousso has said of the film's influence: "There have been lots of movies that have included poker, but only Rounders really captures the energy and tension in the game. And that's why it stands as the best poker movie ever made."

References

External links 

 
 
 
 

1998 films
1990s buddy drama films
1998 drama films
1998 independent films
American buddy drama films
American independent films
Films scored by Christopher Young
Films about the Russian Mafia
Films directed by John Dahl
Films set in New York City
Films set in Atlantic City, New Jersey
Films shot in New York (state)
Films shot in New Jersey
Films shot in Newark, New Jersey
Miramax films
American neo-noir films
Films about poker
1990s English-language films
1990s American films